Emile Capouya was an American essayist, critic, and writer. His book 'In the sparrow Hills' won the Sue Kaufman Prize of the American Academy and Institute of Arts and Letters. Mr. Capouya was born in Manhattan in 1925 and grew up in the Bronx.

Life 
Capouya studied at Columbia University in New York City and started his working life at New Directions. From 1969–1981 he was Literary Editor of The Nation and wrote for The New American Review, The New York Times and The Saturday Review. Capouya published the work of Ezra Pound, Tennessee Williams, Jean-Paul Sartre and James Joyce. In 1971 he was appointed associate professor of English at Baruch College, where he taught for ten years.

In 1993 he published his first book of short stories, In the Sparrow Hills, a compilation of stories based on his time with Handelsmarine in World War II. It won the Sue Kaufman Prize for First Fiction.

In 1968, he married Keitha Capouya who is a publisher. Keitha was the founder of New Amsterdam Books.

Literature
In the Sparrow Hills, Algonquin Books 1993, 
 Ismail Kadare, Emile Capouya: Albanian Spring: The Anatomy of Tyranny, Saqi Books 1994, 
 Emile Capouya, Keitha Capouya: Classic English Love Poems, Hippocrene Books 1999, 
The Rising of the Moon, Lyons Press 2003,

References

External links 
 
 NY Times Article

1925 births
2005 deaths
American critics
American male non-fiction writers
20th-century American male writers
Columbia College (New York) alumni